

Storms
Note:  indicates the name was retired after that usage in the respective basin

 Kai-tak
 2000 –  brushed the coasts of mainland China and Taiwan.
 2005 – a strong tropical cyclone that made landfall in Vietnam and affected the nearby South China and Laos in early-November 2005.
 2012 – a mild tropical cyclone that affected China, Vietnam and Laos.
 2017 – a late-season tropical cyclone that affected Visayas during December 2017.

 Kajiki
 2001 – a weak tropical storm in late 2001.
 2007 – struck Iwo Jima.
 2014 – a storm which headed towards Philippines, killing 6 people.
 2019 – an erratic storm which affected Vietnam, and caused many floodings in the Philippines.
 Kalmaegi
 2002 – did not make landfall.
 2008 – struck Taiwan and China.
 2014 – a storm which brought flooding in southeast Asia during mid-September.
 2019 – impacted northern Philippines during mid-November.

 Kalunde (2003) – was the strongest storm of the 2002–03 South-West Indian Ocean cyclone season.

 Kammuri
 2002 – killed hundreds of people in the wake of a deadly flood season in China.
 2008 – struck China and Vietnam.
 2014 – did not make landfall.
 2019 – made landfall in the Bicol Region of the Philippines at peak intensity as a category 4-equivalent typhoon.

 Kamisy (1984) – was considered the worst tropical cyclone to affect northern Madagascar since 1911.

 Kara
 1969 – Category 2 hurricane, brought storm surge and flooding to coastal North Carolina while moving offshore. 
 2007 – Category 3 severe tropical cyclone, formed off the Kimberley coast.

 Karding
 2014 – tropical depression that affected southern China
 2018 – a damaging tropical storm that impacted Philippines from enhanced southwest monsoon and China.
 2022 – a powerful super typhoon that is currently threatening central and southern Luzon.

 Karen
 1948 – remained over open waters.
 1952 – struck South Korea and Japan.
 1956 – crossed northern Philippines.
 1960 – left 56 dead and 7,000 homeless in the Philippines.
 1962 – destroyed 95% of the buildings on Guam.
 1964 – did not make landfall.
 1977 – a Category 3 tropical cyclone that hit Australia.
 1989 – formed near Isla de la Juventud.
 1995 – minimal storm that was absorbed by Hurricane Iris.
 2001 – made landfall at Nova Scotia as a tropical storm.
 2004 – struck China.
2007 – Category 1 hurricane in the tropical Atlantic. 
 2008 – struck the Philippines and Hong Kong.
 2012 – Category 5 super typhoon that made landfall in South Korea.
2013 – formed in the Gulf of Mexico.
 2016 – destructive Category 4 typhoon that struck the Philippines, South China, and Vietnam.
2019 – briefly affected Puerto Rico before moving out to sea.

 Karim
 2021 – affected most of Ireland and Scotland, bringing rain and moderate wind.
 2022 – remained over the open ocean.

 Karina
 2008 – did not make landfall.
 2014 – a Category 1 hurricane mostly stayed at sea.
 2020 – did not make landfall.

 Karl
 1980 – moved across the central Atlantic; caused no significant effects on land.
 1998 – travelled from north of Bermuda to near the Azores; caused no significant effects on land.
 2004 – formed in the mid-Atlantic and turned north, reaching Category 4 strength in open water before hitting the Faroe Islands as an extratropical storm; caused no significant damage on land.
 2010 – formed in the Caribbean Sea on a path that took it over the Yucatán Peninsula and into the Gulf of Mexico, where it rapidly strengthened to Category 3 before making landfall near Veracruz, Mexico.
 2016 – long-lived but disorganized tropical storm, travelled from near Cape Verde to east of Bermuda; caused no significant effects on land.
 2022 – formed in the Bay of Campeche, moved north-northwestward before reversing course and following a south-southwestward path

 Kate
 1945 – struck Japan.
 1951 – affected Japan.
 1955 – a powerful category 4 typhoon that hit the Philippines, Hainan and Vietnam.
 1959 – affected Philippines.
 1962 (March) – South-West Indian Ocean cyclone that struck eastern Madagascar.
 1962 (July) – were extensive as the storm killed 110 residents and caused $25 million in damages to crops, homes and infrastructure
 1964 – struck Vietnam.
 1967 – struck Philippines and China.
 1970 – killed 915 people in the Philippines.
 1973 – struck South China.
 1976 – briefly threatened Hawaii.
 1985 – Category 3 hurricane, grazed Cuba, directly struck Panama City, Florida.
 1999 – effect on the Philippines.
 2003 – Category 3 hurricane, brushed Newfoundland.
 2006 – short-lived Category 2 cyclone in the northwestern Coral Sea, not a threat to land.
 2014 – severe Category 4 cyclone that moved from the South-East Indian Ocean basin into the South-West Indian Ocean basin, not a threat to land.
 2015 – Category 1 hurricane, brushed the Bahamas.
 2021 – weak and disorganized tropical storm which stayed at sea.

 Katherine
 1963 – a weak tropical storm that made landfall in Southern California.
 1973 – did not make landfall.

 Kathleen
 1947 – Affected Kantō, Japan.
 1961 – not a threat to land.
 1965 – passed southeast of Rodrigues on February 16, generating high waves that reached 3.5 m (11 ft) along the island's southern coast.
 1968 – not a threat to land.
 1972 – came close to land.
 1976 – Category 1 hurricane, made landfall in Baja as a tropical storm, moved into California and Arizona.

 Katia
 1970 – a weak tropical storm that approached Madagascar but did not make it to the island.
 2011 – was a fairly intense Cape Verde hurricane that had substantial impact across Europe as a post-tropical cyclone.
 2017 – a strong Atlantic hurricane which became the most intense storm to hit the Bay of Campeche since Karl in 2010.

 Katie
 1955 – made landfall in Hispaniola as a Category 2 hurricane.
 1964 – a strong tropical cyclone that caused minor damage to the Northern Territory.
 2015 – unofficially named by researchers, was an unusual weather event in early 2015.

 Katrina
 1967 – struck Baja California and caused flooding in the southwest U.S. as a tropical storm.
 1971 – affected Baja California and hit Mexico as a tropical storm.
 1975 – did not affect land.
 1981 – late-season Category 1 hurricane that impacted portions of the Greater Antilles and Bahamas.
 1998 – severe and erratic tropical cyclone that affected the Solomon Islands, Vanuatu, and Northern Australia. Its remnants eventually regenerated into Cyclone Victor–Cindy.
 1999 – Disorganized and weak tropical storm that caused minor damage in Central America and Mexico.
 2005  –  A powerful Category 5 major hurricane that devastated the U.S. Gulf Coast, making landfall first near Miami, Florida, as a Category 1 hurricane, near Buras, Louisiana and Long Beach, Mississippi, at Category 3 intensity, causing over US$125 billion in damage and over 1,800 deaths.

 Katring
 1983 – which struck the Philippines and China.
 1987 – which struck South Korea as a Category 1 typhoon.
 1994 – which struck the Philippines and Vietnam.
 2006 – did not make landfall.
 2010 – the first typhoon to impact Japan since Typhoon Melor in October 2009. 

 Kay
 1980 – a powerful Category 4 hurricane, fifth longest duration in the Pacific Basin, remained mostly at sea.
 1986 – did not make landfall.
 1987 – a category 2 tropical cyclone (Australian scale) impacted Papua New Guinea and Western Australia.
 1992 – did not make landfall.
 1998 – a Category 1 hurricane mostly stayed at sea.
 2004 – did not make landfall.
 2016 – did not make landfall.
 2022 – a Category 2 hurricane that made landfall in Baja California as a tropical storm. 

 Keila (2011) – was the first named storm of the 2011 North Indian Ocean cyclone season.

 Keith
 1977 – Category 1 tropical cyclone (Australian scale) impact Queensland.
 1988 – affected Central America and Florida, causing $7.3 million in damages.
 1997 – a super typhoon which affected Guam and the Northern [[Mariana islan, causing $15 million in damages.
 2000 – a Category 4 hurricane that caused extensive damage in Central America, particularly in Belize and Mexico.

 Keli
 1984 – remained over open waters.
 1986  – a category 1 tropical cyclone (australian scale) minimal affected Vanuatu.
 1996 – the first recorded post-season tropical cyclone to form in June within the South Pacific Ocean.

 Ken
 1979 – struck Japan.
 1982 – struck Japan
 1983 – storm briefly reached Category 3 status before making landfall in the sparsely populated area.
 1986 – a category 2 typhoon mostly stayed at sea.
 1989 – synonymous with that season's Lola (one storm with two names, thought to have been separate due to difficulties in tracking poorly organized systems); hit eastern China.
 1992 – stayed at sea.
 2009 – stayed at sea.

 Kendra
 1966 – an eastern Atlantic October storm that was operationally declared a tropical storm but later determined to have not even been a tropical cyclone and was removed from the official records.
 1978 – not a threat to land.
 Kenna
 1984 – remained well out at sea.
 1990 – a Category 1 hurricane that did not affect land.
 2002 – a Category 5 hurricane that made landfall near San Blas, Mexico.

 Kenneth
 1993 – Category 4 hurricane that did not affect land.
 2005 – Category 4 hurricane whose remnants brought heavy rainfall to Hawaii.
 2011 – Category 4 hurricane that did not affect land.
 2017 – Category 4 hurricane that did not affect land.
 2019 – Category 4 equivalent tropical cyclone that made landfall in Mozambique.

 Kent
 1992 – struck Japan.
 1995 – made landfall on China near Hong Kong.

 Kesiny (2002) – was the first recorded tropical cyclone – the equivalent of a minimal hurricane – to make landfall in the month of May in the south-west Indian Ocean.

 Ketsana
 2003 – remained over the open ocean.
 2009 – struck the Philippines and causing massive flooding in Metro Manila and other provinces nearby.

 Kevin
 1979 – did not strengthen much and dissipated out to sea. 
 1985 – did not make landfall.
 1991 – caused no damage or casualties.
 1997 – did not make landfall.
 2003 – did not impact land.
 2009 – did not impact land.
 2015 – did not impact land.
 2021 – did not make landfall.
 2023 – a powerful Category 5 tropical cyclone the second cyclone that struck at 48 hours in March 2023 on the Pacific island nation of Vanuatu after Cyclone Judy.

 Khai Muk (2008) – made landfall in Andhra Pradesh.

 Khanun
 2005 – the strongest tropical cyclone to make landfall on Zhejiang Province since Wanda in 1956.
 2012 – the first tropical cyclone to directly impact Korea in two years.
 2017 – a mid-range Category 2 typhoon that affected Hainan island as a weak tropical storm.

 Kiko
 1983 – paralleled the Mexican coastline.
 1989 – struck Baja California causing minor damage.
 2001 (September) – struck Ryukyu Islands, Taiwan and China.
 2001 (September) – stayed in the open ocean.
 2005 – struck China
 2007 – killed 15 people in Mexico without ever making landfall.
 2009 – a 2009 storm that struck Ryukyu Islands, Taiwan and China
 2013 (August) – never threatened land.
 2013 (August) – a storm that made landfall in Vietnam during August 7 and 8, 2013.
 2017 – make landfall over Pingtan County of Fujian in China.
 2019 – long-lived tropical cyclone that stayed in the open ocean.
 2021 - a very powerful tropical cyclone which impacted the Cagayan Valley region of the Philippines and became the strongest typhoon to affect the Batanes province since Typhoon Meranti in 2016.

 Kim
 1965 – strong tropical storm which stayed offshore Japan.
 1968 – relatively strong typhoon which recurved at sea.
 1971 – affected the Philippines and Vietnam
 1974 – strong tropical storm which did not affect any landmass.
 1975 – lingered over the Northern Territory and Far North Queensland in early-December 1975.
 1977 – late-season typhoon which struck the Philippines, killing 102
 1980 – struck the Philippines and China.
 1983 – struck Vietnam and Thailand, reportedly causing more than 300 fatalities
 1986 – late-season strong typhoon which did not affect land areas.
 2000 – strong tropical cyclone which only caused minor damage in French Polynesia in late-February 2000.

 Kimi (2021) – a small tropical cyclone which briefly threatened the Eastern Coast of North Queensland in January 2021.

 Kirk
 1996 – struck southwestern Japan.
 2012 – never threatened land.
2018 – a low latitude storm; affecting Lesser Antilles.

 Kirogi
 2000 – passed close to Japan while weakening.
 2005 – not a threat to land.
 2012 – no make landfall.
 2017 – a weak tropical cyclone that affected the Philippines and Vietnam.

 Kristen
 1966 – the eighth tropical cyclone of the 1966 and the second to make landfall in the Baja California peninsula.
 1970 – a weak tropical storm causing squalls near the Mexican coast.
 1974 – not make landfall.
 Kit
 1963 – a category 4 supertyphoon.
 1974 – hitting the Philippines, the system weakened to a tropical depression.
 1978 – a severe tropical storm.
 1988 – a severe tropical storm which made landfall on the extreme northern tip of Luzon Island and then Hong Kong.

King (1950) – was the most severe hurricane to strike the city of Miami, Florida since the 1926 Miami hurricane.

 Kitty
 1949 – struck Japan after Typhoon Judith.
 1971 – struck Rodrigues, causing power outages.
 1973 – tropical disturbance that affected the Northern Territory.

 Klaus
 2009 – caused substantial damage in Spain and France with at least 23 fatalities reported.
 1984 – formed in the eastern Caribbean Sea, caused damage in the Leeward and Virgin Islands.
 1990  – was a minimal Atlantic hurricane that dropped heavy rainfall across the Lesser Antilles in October 1990.

 Knut
 1981 – tropical storm that hit the coast of Mexico.
 1987 – a weak tropical storm was mostly at sea.

 Koguma
 2021 –  a weak tropical cyclone that made landfall in Vietnam, causing minor damage.  

 Kompasu
 2004 – Struck Hong Kong.
 2010 – Skirted Okinawa before making landfall in Seoul, South Korea.
 2016 – struck Japan.
 2021 – a very large and deadly tropical cyclone that affected the Philippines, Taiwan, and southeast China.

 Kong-rey
 2001 – not make landfall.
 2007 – a moderate typhoon that affected Guam and the Northern Mariana Islands in early April 2007.
 2013 – a tropical storm that affected Japan passed off the coast of China and South Korea and came to the coast of Japan as a depression.
 2018 – A Category 5 super typhoon that affected Japan and South Korea.

 Koppu
 2013 – not make landfall. 
 2009 – a typhoon struck China in September 2009.
 2015 – a powerful and devastating tropical cyclone that struck Luzon in October 2015.

 Koryn
 1990 – not make landfall. 
 1993 – struck the Philippines and China.

 Kristy
 1971 – not make landfall.
 1978 – a Category 2 hurricane that formed from the remnants of Hurricane Cora, remained mostly at sea
 1982 – not make landfall.
 1988 – a category 1 hurricane that affected western Mexico.
 1994 – not make landfall.
 2000 – stayed at sea.
 2006 – stayed at sea.
 2012 – did not make landfall.
 2018 – stayed at sea.

 Krosa
 2001 – a storm that never affected land.
 2007 – struck Taiwan and China.
 2013 – struck the Philippines and affected Vietnam.
 2019 — struck Japan as a tropical storm.

 Krovanh
 2003 – struck the Philippines and China.
 2009 – a tropical storm that passed off the coast of Japan.
 2015 – stayed at sea.
 2020 – a tropical cyclone which caused deadly flooding in the Philippines during December 2020.

 Kujira
 2003 – threatened the Philippines and Taiwan before approaching Japan.
 2009 – affected the Philippines before turning out to sea.
 2015 – formed in the South China Sea.
 2020 – stayed at sea.

 Kulap
 2005 – remained over the open ocean.
 2011 – passed through the Ryukyu Islands.
 2017 – remained over the open ocean.
 2022 – remained over the open ocean.

Kurumí (2020) – a subtropical storm that brought heavy rainfall to the southeastern region of Brazil that caused widespread flooding and landslides.

 Kyant (2016) – was last noted as a well-marked low-pressure area off the coast of southern Andhra Pradesh.

 Kyarr (2019) – was an extremely powerful tropical cyclone that became the first super cyclonic storm in the North Indian Ocean since Gonu in 2007.
 
 Kyle
 1990 – stayed at sea.
 1993 – struck the Philippines and Vietnam.
 1996 – formed in the western Caribbean and made landfall over Guatemala and Honduras as a weakening storm, causing no significant damage.
 2002 – long-lived hurricane, bobbed in and out of the Carolinas, causing $5 million damage, mostly from tornadoes.
 2008 – formed north of Hispaniola and made landfall in Nova Scotia as a minimal hurricane.
 2020 – earliest eleventh named storm on record, formed off the coast of New Jersey and dissipated out in the ocean.

See also

European windstorm names
Atlantic hurricane season
Pacific hurricane season
Tropical cyclone naming
South Atlantic tropical cyclone
Tropical cyclone

References

 
 
 
 
 
 
 
 
 
 
 
 
 
 
 
 
 

 
 
 
 
 

K